Alucita sailtavica is a moth of the family Alucitidae. It is found in Russia.

References

Moths described in 1993
Alucitidae
Moths of Asia
Taxa named by Aleksei Konstantinovich Zagulyaev